Carwatha College P-12 is a state co-educational school located in Noble Park North, Victoria, Australia. Alumni include Glenn Archer and Academy Award winner Adam Elliot.

External links
 Official school website
 Latest News 
 PARENT & STUDENT PORTAL

Public high schools in Victoria (Australia)
Educational institutions established in 1979
1979 establishments in Australia
Educational institutions established in 1998
1998 establishments in Australia
Buildings and structures in the City of Greater Dandenong